Winnetka is a village in Cook County, Illinois, United States, located  north of downtown Chicago. The population was 12,744 as of the 2020 census. The village is one of the wealthiest places in the United States in terms of household income. It was the second-ranked Illinois community on Bloomberg's 2019 Richest Places Annual Index. In 2020, 24/7 Wall St ranked Winnetka as the second-best small town to live in in the United States.

History
The first houses were built in 1836. That year, Erastus Patterson and his family arrived from Vermont and opened a tavern to service passengers on the Green Bay Trail post road. The village was first subdivided in 1854 by Charles Peck and Walter S. Gurnee, President of the Chicago, Milwaukee & St. Paul Railroad. Winnetka's first private school was opened in 1856 by Mr. and Mrs. Charles Peck with seventeen pupils. In 1859, the first public school building was built with private funds at the southeast corner of Elm and Maple streets. The first year's budget for this school was $200. The village was incorporated in 1869 with a population of 450. The name is believed to originate from the Potawatomi language, meaning 'beautiful place'.
	 
The oldest surviving house in Winnetka is the Schmidt-Burnham Log House. Originally constructed on what is now the Indian Hill Club on the south edge of town and in 1917 moved to Tower Road, it was moved in 2003 from Tower Road to the Crow Island Woods.
	 
Winnetka's neighborhoods include estates and homes designed by distinguished architects including George Washington Maher, Walter Burley Griffin, John S. Van Bergen, Robert Seyfarth, Robert McNitt, Howard Van Doren Shaw and David Adler.  Among Winnetka's celebrities are actor Rock Hudson and rock singer/songwriter/producer Richard Marx.

Churches in Winnetka were also designed by noted architects.  Among them, the former First Church of Christ, Scientist, 440 Ridge Avenue, was designed in 1924 by architect Solon S. Beman.

In the 1920s, a colonial Georgian house was built at 671 Lincoln Avenue. The house is now known as the famous Home Alone house for its interior being used as a shooting location for two films in the series, starting in 1990.
	
The Chicago and Milwaukee Railway was built in 1855 through Winnetka, connecting its namesake cities. It eventually became the Chicago & Northwestern Railway. Between 1937 and 1942 the railroad tracks through Winnetka were grade separated after several people were hit at grade crossings. In 1995 the C&NW was merged into the Union Pacific. Only Metra trains are operated on this track now; freight operations ended in the late 1980s. Winnetka has three Metra stations: Hubbard Woods, Winnetka, and Indian Hill.
	 
The Chicago, North Shore and Milwaukee electric interurban was built through Winnetka and the North Shore in the first decade of the 1900s, and the line through Winnetka was removed in 1955. This is now the Green Bay Trail bicycle path.

In 1904, the Winnetka Park District was established, making it the fourth oldest park district in the state of Illinois. Today, the park district maintains and operates 27 parks, five beaches, and golf, tennis, ice skating/hockey, and paddle tennis facilities.
	
The Crow Island School, designed by Eliel & Eero Saarinen and the architectural firm Perkins, Wheeler & Will, was declared a National Historical Landmark in 1990. It was declared 12th among all buildings and the best architectural design of all schools. Ten thousand people attended the opening in 1938.

In 1965, Martin Luther King Jr. spoke in Winnetka.  A plaque dedicated to him is on the Village Green, a park in the town, where he spoke. As a result of Dr. King's open housing campaign and the North Shore Summer Project, the nonprofit now known as Open Communities was founded.

Geography

Demographics

As of the 2020 census there were 12,744 people, 4,204 households, and 3,461 families residing in the village. The racial makeup of the village was 89.17% White, 0.25% African American, 0.04% Native American, 3.52% Asian, 0.02% Pacific Islander, 0.71% from other races, and 6.28% from two or more races. Hispanic or Latino of any race were 4.01% of the population.

There were 4,204 households, out of which 94.31% had children under the age of 18 living with them, 77.88% were married couples living together, 3.50% had a female householder with no husband present, and 17.67% were non-families. 16.34% of all households were made up of individuals, and 8.44% had someone living alone who was 65 years of age or older. The average household size was 3.31 and the average family size was 2.94.

The village's age distribution consisted of 32.4% under the age of 18, 4.2% from 18 to 24, 16.5% from 25 to 44, 30.3% from 45 to 64, and 16.5% who were 65 years of age or older. The median age was 42.1 years. For every 100 females, there were 95.9 males. For every 100 females age 18 and over, there were 94.6 males.

The median income for a household in the village was in excess of $250,000, as was the median income for a family. Males had a median income of $200,944 versus $66,726 for females. The per capita income for the village was $134,596. About 1.7% of families and 2.6% of the population were below the poverty line, including 1.8% of those under age 18 and 1.3% of those age 65 or over.

Education
The Winnetka Public Schools system (District 36) consists of three elementary schools and two middle schools.  Hubbard Woods, Crow Island, and Samuel Sewall Greeley (est. 1912) Elementary Schools serve grades kindergarten through four,  students in fifth and sixth grades attend the Skokie School and seventh and eighth graders attend the Carleton W. Washburne School, named after educator Carleton Washburne. Winnetka's schools were modeled after Washburne's educational philosophy in an experiment called the Winnetka Plan. The town's schools continue to reflect his educational philosophy.

Some neighborhoods in the southern part of Winnetka are served by Avoca School District 37, which has schools in Glenview (Avoca West Elementary School; K-5) and Wilmette (Marie Murphy School; 6–8). Kenilworth School District 38 (Sears School; K-8) also includes a very small portion of the southeastern part of Winnetka, near Kenilworth.

Winnetka is in New Trier Township, and public school students who reside in Winnetka attend New Trier High School for grades 9 through 12. North Shore Country Day School is a private school option.

Crow Island is a National Historic Landmark due to its significant architectural design.

Private schools
 Hadley Institute for the Blind and Visually Impaired
 La Petite École, Winnetka Campus (Preschool–9), bilingual school
 North Shore Country Day School (JK–12)
 Sacred Heart School (Preschool–8), Catholic school
 The School of Saints Faith, Hope & Charity (Preschool–8), Catholic school

Media
Media outlets covering Winnetka include the Winnetka-Glencoe Patch, the Chicago Tribune'''s TribLocal, the Pioneer Press, Winnetka Talk, and The Winnetka Current.

 Notable people 

 Ivan Albright, painter, sculptor and print-maker; attended New Trier High School
 Trish Andrew, basketball player, attended New Trier High School
 Ann-Margret, actress, attended New Trier High School
 Adam Baldwin, actor, attended New Trier High School
 Peter Baldwin, director
 Page Morton Black, singer, chairperson of Parkinson's Disease Foundation 
 David Bradley, director, born in Winnetka
 Ann Hampton Callaway, singer, lived in Winnetka and attended New Trier High School
 Liz Callaway, singer, lived in Winnetka and attended New Trier High School
 Katie Chang, actress, lives in Winnetka and attended New Trier High School.
 Anne Clarke (politician), American-born British Labour Party politician, London Assembly member for Barnet and Camden grew up in Winnetka. 
 Dale Clevenger, principal horn, Chicago Symphony Orchestra
 Chris Collins, basketball coach, lives in Winnetka
 Richard Dickson Cudahy, jurist, lived in Winnetka
 Jay Cutler, NFL quarterback, lived in Winnetka
 Bruce Dern, actor, attended New Trier High School
 Phil Donahue, talk show host, lived in Winnetka
 Conor Dwyer, Olympic swimmer, 2012 gold medalist
 Christine Ebersole, Tony Award-winning actress
 Neal Edelstein, film producer and director, raised in Winnetka
 Deborah Eisenberg, short-story writer, winner of MacArthur Fellowship
Gil Elvgren, painter
 Mary Callahan Erdoes, CEO of JPMorgan Chase's Asset & Wealth Management division, raised in Winnetka
 Marion Mahony Griffin (1871–1961), first architect employed by Frank Lloyd Wright; helped design Canberra, capital of Australia, grew up in Winnetka
 Rick Hahn, general manager of Chicago White Sox
 Carl L. Hamilton, named partner in the Booz Allen Hamilton management and information technology consulting firm
 Charlton Heston, actor, lived in Winnetka and attended New Trier High School
 Roger Hochschild, CEO and President of Discover Financial Services, lives in Winnetka
 Rock Hudson, actor; born and raised in Winnetka and attended New Trier High School
 Harold L. Ickes, former United States Secretary of the Interior, built home at 900 Private Road
 Matt Kaskey, offensive tackle for the Carolina Panthers
 Bruce Krasberg, industrialist and horticulturist, lived in Winnetka
 Kate Liu, pianist, lives in Winnetka and attended New Trier High School
 Matt Lottich, basketball coach, Valparaiso
 Virginia Madsen, actress, attended New Trier High School
 Kim Milford, actor
 Penelope Milford, actress
 John Moore, defenseman playing in the NHL's Anaheim Ducks organization 
 Chris O'Donnell, actor (G. Callen on NCIS: Los Angeles)
 Tom O'Halleran, member of the United States House of Representatives from Arizona's 1st congressional district. He lived in Winnetka while a member of the Chicago Board of Trade.
 Samuel Shackford Otis, architect
 Liz Phair, musician, grew up in Winnetka
 Ralph Pomeroy, poet and writer
 Eliot Porter, photographer, was born and grew up in Winnetka.
 Fairfield Porter, painter and art critic, was born and grew up in Winnetka.
 Janet Meakin Poor, landscape architect and plant conservationist 
 Clarence B. Randall, businessman
 Bruce Rauner, former Governor of Illinois, former chairman of R8 Capital Partners
 Jeffrey Ross, former Partner at Lehman Brothers, co-founder of Main Street Investment Advisors, notable private investor, attended New Trier High School
 Alexander Ross, Managing Principal at Main Street Investment Advisors
 Pat Ryan, founder and executive chairman of Aon Corporation
 Donald Rumsfeld, former Secretary of Defense, attended New Trier High School
 Jenny Sanford, former First Lady of South Carolina
 Jack Steinberger, refugee from Nazi Germany, attended New Trier High School, won 1988 Nobel Prize in Physics, gave Nobel medal to school
 W. Clement Stone, businessman and philanthropist
 Walter A. Strong, publisher of Chicago Daily News,
 R. Douglas Stuart, Jr., CEO of Quaker Oats and U.S. ambassador to Norway, born in Winnetka
 Marlo Thomas, actress, lived in Winnetka
 Paul Thomas, pornographic actor
 Henry Totten, Wisconsin State Assemblyman and businessman, lived in Winnetka
 Marc Trestman, former head coach of Chicago Bears, lived in Winnetka
 Joe Trohman, guitarist of Fall Out Boy, attended New Trier High School
 Byron Trott, banker
 Barbara Turf, former president and CEO of Crate & Barrel
 Bernice T. Van der Vries, state legislator, lived in Winnetka
 Rocky Wirtz, owner of the Chicago Blackhawks, attended North Shore Country Day School, lives in Winnetka
 Ying Quartet originally consisted of four siblings from Winnetka; as of 2017, three siblings remain members of the ensemble 

In popular culture
"Big Noise from Winnetka," a 1938 jazz song by The Bobcats, has been featured in a number of Hollywood movies, including Let's Make Music and Reveille with Beverly.

Winnetka was mentioned in the novel Havana by Stephen Hunter. Secondary character Roger St. John Evans was mentioned as "The Big Noise From Winnetka".

 Film 
The  film Home Alone is set in Winnetka, and featured scenes filmed at 671 Lincoln Avenue. The street address is mentioned in the film, but the street is called "Lincoln Boulevard". The opening scenes of the sequel Home Alone 2: Lost in New York were filmed at the same house. Over three decades after the original film's 1990 release, sightseers still visit the North Shore neighborhood, particularly around the Christmas holiday season.

Numerous other films have been shot in Winnetka, including portions of films Ocean's 12, Breakfast Club, National Lampoon's Vacation, Ferris Bueller's Day Off, Sixteen Candles, Risky Business, Planes, Trains & Automobiles, She's Having a Baby and Uncle Buck. The film Contagion was filmed in the area in the spring of 2011. Holidate, a 2020 Netflix romantic comedy starring Emma Roberts and Luke Bracey, is set in Winnetka.

 Television 
A popular TV series, Sisters (1991–1996), was set primarily in Winnetka, but was not filmed there, except for some exterior establishing shots. This was also true of its erstwhile summer replacement series, Winnetka Road.

The characters on the TV series The League reside in Winnetka.

The TV series I Didn't Do It is set in Winnetka. The characters attend the fictional Ditka High School.

See also

References
Notes

Further reading
 Dickinson, Lora Townsend. The Story of Winnetka''. Winnetka: Winnetka Historical Society, 1956. Print.

External links

 Village of Winnetka official website
 Winnetka Public School District
 Winnetka Historical Society
 Winnetka Historical Society: History of Buildings
 Winnetka Park District

 
Villages in Cook County, Illinois
Villages in Illinois
Chicago metropolitan area
Populated places established in 1869
1869 establishments in Illinois